Hedy Scott (born 24 January 1946) is a Belgian-American model and actress. Scott was born in Jodoigne, Walloon Brabant, Wallonia, Belgium. She came to the United States on a war-bride ship with her mother.  She was an American Citizen as her father was a U.S. Soldier in the American Army and was stationed in Belgium during World War II.
Scott became Playboy magazine's Playmate of the Month for its June 1965 issue. Her centerfold was photographed by Ron Vogel. She went on to have a brief acting career, appearing in Fireball 500 (1966) and an episode of The Munsters.

Film and television work 
 Fireball 500 (1966)  .... Leander Fan
 The Munsters (1966)  .... 2nd Girl

See also
 List of people in Playboy 1960–1969

References

External links 
 
 

1946 births
Living people
American film actresses
American television actresses
Belgian emigrants to the United States
Belgian film actresses
Belgian television actresses
People from Jodoigne
1960s Playboy Playmates
21st-century American women